Local elections were held in Malaysia in 1964.

City council election

George Town

Municipal election

Kuala Lumpur

Malacca

Town councils election

Alor Star

Bandar Maharani, Muar

Bandar Penggaram, Batu Pahat

Bukit Mertajam

Butterworth

Ipoh-Menglembu

Johore Bahru

Kampar

Klang

Kluang

Kota Bharu

Kuala Kangsar

Kuala Pilah

Kuala Trengganu

Kuantan

Pasir Mas

Pasir Puteh

Raub

Segamat

Seremban

Sungei Patani

Taiping

Tanjong Malim

Tapah

Teluk Anson

Temerloh-Mentekab

Tumpat

Local councils election

Gurun

References

1964
1964 elections in Malaysia